Rictaxiella is a genus of sea snails, bubble snails, marine opisthobranch gastropod mollusks in the family Aplustridae.

Species
 Rictaxiella choshiensis Habe, 1958
 Rictaxiella debelius Poppe, Tagaro & Chino, 2011
 Rictaxiella joyae Poppe, Tagaro & Chino, 2011

References

 Poppe, G., Tagaro, S. & Chino, M., 2011. Two new Rictaxiella (Gastropoda: Bullinidae) from the Philippines. Visaya 3(3): 76-82

External links
 

Aplustridae